Danbury is a city in Woodbury County, Iowa, United States. It is part of the Sioux City, IA–NE–SD Metropolitan Statistical Area. The population was 320 at the time of the 2020 census.  Danbury has two churches, St. Mary's Catholic Church and the United Methodist Church.  Danbury holds a fall celebration called Corn Days during harvest.

History
A post office called Danbury has been in operation since 1877. The city's name is an amalgamation of the name of its founder, Daniel Thomas, and the county in which it is located, Woodbury.

Geography
Danbury is located at  (42.236002, -95.721755). It is situated on the Maple River.

Demographics

2010 census
As of the census of 2010, there were 348 people, 159 households, and 96 families living in the city. The racial makeup of the city was 97.7% White, 1.7% Native American, 0.3% Asian, and 0.3% from two or more races.

There were 159 households, of which 23.3% had children under the age of 18 living with them, 48.4% were married couples living together, 6.9% had a female householder with no husband present, 5.0% had a male householder with no wife present, and 39.6% were non-families. 34.6% of all households were made up of individuals, and 17% had someone living alone who was 65 years of age or older. The average household size was 2.19 and the average family size was 2.81.

The median age in the city was 44.3 years. 23.3% of residents were under the age of 18; 6.6% were between the ages of 18 and 24; 21.8% were from 25 to 44; 25% were from 45 to 64; and 23.3% were 65 years of age or older. The gender makeup of the city was 47.1% male and 52.9% female.

2000 census
As of the census of 2000, there were 384 people, 177 households, and 107 families living in the city. The racial makeup of the city was 99.74% White, and 0.26% from two or more races.

There were 177 households, out of which 26.0% had children under the age of 18 living with them, 53.1% were married couples living together, 6.2% had a female householder with no husband present, and 39.0% were non-families. 37.3% of all households were made up of individuals, and 27.7% had someone living alone who was 65 years of age or older. The average household size was 2.17 and the average family size was 2.84.

25.3% are under the age of 18, 3.9% from 18 to 24, 24.0% from 25 to 44, 22.4% from 45 to 64, and 24.5% who were 65 years of age or older. The median age was 43 years. For every 100 females, there were 80.3 males. For every 100 females age 18 and over, there were 73.9 males.

The median income for a household in the city was $33,409, and the median income for a family was $40,625. Males had a median income of $27,083 versus $20,938 for females. The per capita income for the city was $21,801. About 8.0% of families and 9.3% of the population were below the poverty line, including 14.3% of those under age 18 and 9.4% of those age 65 or over.

News media
Danbury is served by The Danbury Review, a weekly newspaper published by Michael Buth.  The paper is created and edited by Lynn Buth.  Michael and Lynn purchased the newspaper from Dave Colbert in August 1999.

Education
The Maple Valley–Anthon–Oto Community School District operates public schools serving the community.

It was previously a part of the Maple Valley Community School District, established in 1961. On July 1, 2012, the Maple Valley district consolidated with the Anthon–Oto Community School District to form the new Maple Valley–Anthon–Oto district.

Emergency services
Fire, ambulance, and police protection in Danbury is provided by the Danbury Fire Department, the Danbury Ambulance Service, and the Woodbury County Sheriff's Office respectively.

References

External links
The Danbury Review

Cities in Woodbury County, Iowa
Cities in Iowa
Sioux City metropolitan area